The 2022 Caribbean Premier League (CPLT20) or CPL 10 or for sponsorship reasons, Hero CPL 2022 was the tenth season of the Caribbean Premier League, the domestic Twenty20 cricket league that was played in the West Indies. The tournament was held from 31 August, with the final played on 30 September 2022. A women's tournament was also held concurrent with the men's tournament. Saint Kitts and Nevis was named as one of the hosts, with Guyana hosting the playoffs. St Kitts & Nevis Patriots were the defending champions. In June 2022, A modified T10 tournament, called The 6ixty, between the six teams were announced to be scheduled to place between 24 and 28 August 2022 right before the actual tournament.

Squads
The following players were retained or signed by their respective teams for the tournament.

Points table

 Top four teams advance to the Playoffs
  advanced to the Qualifier 1
  advanced to the Eliminator

League stage

Playoffs

Qualifier 1

Eliminator

Qualifier 2

Final

Statistics

Most runs

Most wickets

References

External links
 Series home at ESPN Cricinfo

Caribbean Premier League
Caribbean Premier League